Coelopa vanduzeei is a species of kelp flies in the family Coelopidae.

References

Coelopidae
Diptera of North America
Taxa named by Ezra Townsend Cresson
Insects described in 1914
Articles created by Qbugbot